The 2017 Bengaluru Open was a professional tennis tournament played on hard courts. It was the first edition of the tournament which was part of the 2017 ATP Challenger Tour. It took place in Bangalore, India from 20 to 25 November 2017.

Singles main-draw entrants

Seeds

 1 Rankings are as of 13 November 2017.

Other entrants
The following players received wildcards into the singles main draw:
  Suraj Prabodh
  Dalwinder Singh
  Vishnu Vardhan

The following players received entry from the qualifying draw:
  Borna Gojo
  Vijay Sundar Prashanth
  Sidharth Rawat
  Matej Sabanov

The following players received entry as lucky losers:
  Antoine Escoffier
  Naoki Nakagawa

Champions

Singles

  Sumit Nagal def.  Jay Clarke 6–3, 3–6, 6–2.

Doubles

  Mikhail Elgin /  Divij Sharan def.  Ivan Sabanov /  Matej Sabanov 6–3, 6–0.

References

2017 ATP Challenger Tour
2017
2017 in Indian tennis